Kirovske (in US intelligence, Kirovskoye) is a Russian Air Force base located in Kirovske Raion, near the town of Kirovske, Crimea, Ukraine.

The base is home to a detachment of the 929th State Flight Test Centre named for V. P. Chkalov.

Kirovske was the primary anti-submarine warfare (ASW) test and development center for Soviet Naval Aviation, and it worked closely with the flight test center at Akhtubinsk. 

An interceptor regiment, the 136 IAP (136th Fighter Aviation Regiment) at Kirovske operated the Sukhoi Su-9 (ASCC: Fishpot) in the 1960s and 1970s.  These were last seen at Kirovske in August 1979 before the runway was closed for expansion in the early 1980s.  Other aircraft such as the Mikoyan-Gurevich MiG-15 (ASCC: Fresco) and Sukhoi Su-7 (ASCC: Fitter) were known to be present at Kirovske in the 1970s.

The base was used by the 326th Fighter Aviation Regiment between 1950 and 1979.

References

Soviet Air Defence Force bases
Soviet Naval Aviation bases
Russian and Soviet Navy bases
Russian Air Force bases